The 1989–90 All-Ireland Senior Club Football Championship was the 20th staging of the All-Ireland Senior Club Football Championship since its establishment by the Gaelic Athletic Association in 1970-71.

Nemo Rangers were the defending champions, however, they failed to qualify after being beaten by St. Finbarr's in the semi-final of 1989 Cork County Championship.

On 17 March 1990, Baltinglass won the championship following a 2-07 to 0-07 defeat of Clann na nGael in the All-Ireland final at Croke Park. It remains their only championship title.

Results

Munster Senior Club Football Championship

First round

Semi-finals

Final

All-Ireland Senior Club Football Championship

Quarter-final

Semi-finals

Final

Championship statistics

Miscellaneous

 Clann na nGael became the first team to win six successive Connacht Club Championship titles.
 St. Vincent's won the Leinster Club Championship for the first time in their history. They were also the first team from Dublin to win the provincial title.

References

1989 in Gaelic football
1990 in Gaelic football